Flint Castle in Flint, Flintshire, was the first of a series of castles built during King Edward I's campaign to conquer Wales.

The site was chosen for its strategic position in North East Wales. The castle was only one day's march from Chester, supplies could be brought along the River Dee and there was a ford nearby across to England that could be used at low tide.

Construction
Building work began in 1277 initially under Richard , who would later become Mayor of Chester in 1304. The castle and its earthworks were built by 18,000 
labourers and masons using local Millstone Grit ashlar and sandstone. Savoyard master mason James of Saint George was assigned "ad ordiandum opera castorum ibidem" (to undertake the works of the same castle works (referring to all Welsh castle building projects) in April 1278. November 1280 saw him beginning directly overseeing construction at Flint for Edward I as the initially very slow construction pace was accelerated. He remained at the castle for 17 months.  James of Saint George then moved onto Rhuddlan to oversee its completion.

When work ceased in 1284, Flint Castle had an inner ward and an outer bailey. They were separated by a tidal moat and were connected with gatehouse and drawbridge. A plantation town was also laid out beyond the outer bailey. The inner ward had three large towers and a detached keep. This isolated tower protected the inner gatehouse and outer bailey. In total expenditure, Edward I spent £6068.7.5d. creating the fortress and the town (£ in 2008).

Flint, on the western shore of the River Dee estuary, could be supplied by river or sea. Its harbour was protected by a defensive wall. The castle lies opposite to the English shore and Shotwick Castle in England. Before the course was changed in the 18th century, passage across the estuary at this point could be made directly by boat at high tide or by fording at low tide.

Unique fortress design

The castle is based on Savoyard models where one of the corner towers is enlarged and isolated. This independent structure served as both corner tower and keep or donjon, like at Dourdan, France. Flint's keep has been compared to the donjon at Aigues-Mortes, France. Edward I may have been familiar with Aigues-Mortes having passed through the fortress on the way to join the Eighth Crusade in 1270. An alternative possibility is the influence of Jean Mésot on James of Saint George, Mésot having worked in Southern France before influencing Saint George in Savoy. The castle at Flint has also been described as a "classic Carrė Savoyard" as it is very similar to Yverdon Castle. Its ground dimensions are a third bigger but it shares the classic shape and style, along with the use of a corner tower as keep (donjon). Most historians attribute this to input from Edward's premier architect and castle builder James of Saint George Although construction began in 1277 and James of Saint George didn't begin work at Flint until 1280, he was in England from 1278 and was described as "ad ordinandum opera castorum ibidem", that is, charged with the design of the works at Flint.

The keep is an impressive structure. Access was gained by crossing a drawbridge into a central entrance chamber on the first floor. Originally there would have been at least one additional storey. These floors had small rooms built into the thick walls. A timber gallery was built on top of the keep for the visit of Edward, Prince of Wales, in 1301. On the ground floor is a vaulted passage that runs all the way around the inside of the keep.

Flint's design was not repeated in any other castle built by Edward I in North Wales. The layout at Flint remains unique within the British Isles.

History

Flint was the first castle of what would later become known as Edward I's "Iron Ring". A chain of fortresses designed to encircle North Wales and oppress the Welsh. Its construction began almost immediately after Edward I began the First Welsh War in 1277.

Five years later Welsh forces under the command of Dafydd ap Gruffydd, brother of Llywelyn ap Gruffudd, besieged the castle in an attempted uprising against the English Crown. In 1294 Flint was attacked again during the revolt of Madog ap Llywelyn; this time the constable of the castle was forced to set fire to the fortress to prevent its capture by the Welsh. The castle was later repaired and partly rebuilt.

With the conclusion to the Welsh Wars, English settlers and merchants were given property titles in the new town that was laid out in front of the castle. The plantation borough was protected by a defensive ditch with a wooden palisade on earth banking
. Its outline remains visible in streets patterns.

In 1399 Richard II of England was held by Henry Bolingbroke at Flint before being returned to London.

During the English Civil War, Flint Castle was held by the Royalists. It was finally captured by the Parliamentarians in 1647 after a three-month siege. To prevent its reuse in the conflict, the castle was then slighted in accordance with Cromwell's destruction order. The ruins are what remain today.

By the 19th century part of the site's outer bailey was used as Flintshire's County Jail. A quarry operated nearby.

Present day
Flint Castle, which has been managed as public monument for 90 years, is now maintained by Cadw, a Welsh-government body that protects, conserves and promotes the building heritage of Wales. Access is free and via a path. Most parts of the castle, such as the isolated keep, are open to the public.

In mid August 2009, the agency temporarily closed Flint Castle to the public because of problems with anti-social behaviour. Cadw said youths were drinking on the site and vandalising the castle.

Later works

In 1838 J. M. W. Turner painted a watercolour of the castle.

 was a Royal Navy  launched in 1943, named after Flint Castle.

Constable
From 1284 to 1935 the Constable of Flint Castle served ex officio as the Mayor of Flint. The constable's residence was, prior to its destruction, in the donjon tower.

List of Constables

Gallery

See also
Rhuddlan Castle
List of castles in Wales

Notes

References

External links

www.geograph.co.uk : photos of Flint Castle

Castles in Flintshire
Cadw
Castle ruins in Wales
Grade I listed castles in Wales
Scheduled monuments in Flintshire
Flint, Flintshire